Muhammet Ömer Çakı (born 14 January 2000) is a Turkish professional footballer who plays as a defender for Tarsus Idman Yurdu.

Professional career
On 3 August 2018, Çakı signed his first professional contract with  Fenerbahçe. Çakı made his debut for Fenerbahçe in a 1-0 Europa League loss to FC Spartak Trnava on 13 December 2018.

References

External links
 
 
 

2000 births
People from Fatih
Footballers from Istanbul
Living people
Turkish footballers
Turkey youth international footballers
Association football defenders
Fenerbahçe S.K. footballers
Adanaspor footballers
Tarsus Idman Yurdu footballers
TFF First League players
TFF Third League players